Neil Mitchell may refer to:

 Neil Mitchell (cricketer) (born 1936), South African cricketer
 Neil Mitchell (musician) (born 1965), Scottish musician
 Neil Mitchell (footballer) (born 1974), English former professional footballer
 Neil Mitchell (radio presenter) (born 1951), Australian radio presenter